Frank L. Crane (August 18, 1907 – December 25, 1973) was an American civil servant who served as the North Carolina Commissioner of Labor from June 3, 1954, to 1973.

Early life 
Frank Crane was born on August 18, 1907, near Waxhaw, North Carolina, United States to James Thomas Crane and Mary Emma Lathan. He attended Marvin Elementary School, Weddington Institute, and Prospect High School, graduating from the latter in 1927. He earned a bachelor's degree from the University of North Carolina at Chapel Hill in 1931. He then took courses at the university's summer school from 1931 to 1934 and attended classes in personnel management at North Carolina State College in 1939. 

Crane married Edith Peacock on January 1, 1938. The two had no children and separated in 1961. Crane subsequently married Mary Browning Comer.

Career 
From 1931 to 1934 Crane worked as an athletic instructor at Welcome High School in Davidson County. He then worked as the safety director for the North Carolina Industrial Commission until 1938, when he became an administrative assistant for the North Carolina Employment Service. In 1939 he was hired by the North Carolina Department of Labor as a factory wage and hour inspector. In 1941 Crane became Director of the department's Conciliation and Arbitration Division.

On June 3, 1954, Crane was appointed by Governor William B. Umstead to serve as North Carolina Commissioner of Labor, filling in a vacancy created by the death of the previous incumbent, Forrest H. Shuford. A member of the Democratic Party, he won election on November 2, 1954. He was reelected to a full four-year term in 1956 and was further reelected in 1960, 1964, and 1968. He declared his decision not to run again for office on January 18, 1972, citing "entirely personal" reasons. He supported William C. Creel's candidacy to succeed him. Crane held the record for longest tenure as North Carolina Labor Commissioner until he was surpassed by Cherie Berry in 2019.

Crane suffered a heart attack while gardening at his home and subsequently died in the morning on December 25, 1973, at Rex Hospital in Raleigh, North Carolina.

References

Works cited 
 

1907 births
1973 deaths
North Carolina Commissioners of Labor
North Carolina Democrats
People from Waxhaw, North Carolina